Olivier Jean Marie Fernand Gendebien (12 January 1924 – 2 October 1998) was a Belgian racing driver who was called "one of the greatest sportscar racers of all time".

Rally racer
Gendebien spent some years in the Belgian Congo.  On his return to Europe he teamed up with Fraikin to compete in the 1952 Liège–Rome–Liège Rally using a Jaguar Mk VII saloon car.  Together with Pierre Stasse, Gendebien won the sixth running of the Tulip Rally in Zandvoort in April 1954. Their car was an Alfa Romeo 1900 TI. The Gendebien and Fraiken partnership gained the nickname "the eternal bridesmaids", owing to their number of second-place finishes, but after two previous attempts they triumphed in the Liège–Rome–Liège Rally, the Coppa d'Oro delle Dolomiti and Rally Stella Alpina in 1955, driving a Mercedes-Benz 300SL. In 1956 Olivier Gendebien and Pierre Stasse finished in third place driving a Ferrari 250 GT Europa (Nr 0373).

Formula One driver
Gendebien's success in rally competitions brought him to the attention of Enzo Ferrari, who offered him a contract to drive a Ferrari in sports car events and selected Grands Prix. Much respected as a true gentleman by everyone who knew him, he remained a member of the Ferrari team until he retired from racing. Enzo Ferrari summed him up as "a gentleman who never forgets that noblesse oblige and, when he is at the wheel, he translates this code of behaviour into an elegant and discerning forcefulness."

During his career he competed in only 15 Formula One races as most of the time he was Ferrari's spare driver, filling in only occasionally. He nonetheless scored points in five races, and was only one place away from a points-scoring finish on a further two occasions.

He made his début at the 1956 Argentine Grand Prix, with the Ferrari team, but it was during a stint driving for the British Racing Partnership's Yeoman Credit Racing team in  that Gendebien scored his best finishes; he took second in the 1960 French Grand Prix and third in front of a home crowd at the 1960 Belgian Grand Prix.

The second of these was a somewhat bitter-sweet success, as Gendebien's team-mate at the time, Chris Bristow, was killed in an accident during the race. Gendebien himself walked away with slight injuries in October 1961 after his Lotus-Climax failed to negotiate a turn during practice for the 1961 United States Grand Prix at Watkins Glen, New York. The car flipped over and Gendebien's shoes were torn off by the impact.

Sports car competition
However, it was in sports car racing, particularly the long distance and endurance events, where Gendebien excelled. Piloting a 2.5-litre Ferrari, Gendebien teamed up with Maurice Trintignant to place third in the 1956 24 Hours of Le Mans. They were seven laps behind the winners, privateer Ecurie Ecosse Jaguar drivers Ron Flockhart and Ninian Sanderson. The 1958 Grand Prix of Buenos Aires was a 1,000 kilometre event in which Gendebien paired with Wolfgang von Trips. They finished second to a fellow Ferrari pairing Phil Hill and Peter Collins. In the race Argentine Maserati driver, Jorge Magnasco, died after his car skidded and turned over.

The same year he partnered Hill and won the prestigious 24 Hours of Le Mans. Their victory came in a 3-litre Ferrari and secured the World Sportscar Championship for the Ferrari factory. They covered 2,511 miles with an average speed of 107 miles per hour. Hill became the first American to win the event and their Ferrari was the sole factory-sponsored car running at the end. Ferrari drivers took the first three positions at the conclusion of the 1961 24 Hours of Le Mans and, as they were to be again the following year, Hill and Gendebien were first, averaging 115.89 miles per hour, and establishing a race record. Gendebien's record number of Le Mans victories was not exceeded until , when fellow-Belgian Jacky Ickx won for the fifth time.

Away from Circuit de la Sarthe, Gendebien also triumphed in the Targa Florio (1958, '61, '62), the 12 Hours of Sebring (1959, '60, '61), the 12 Hours of Reims (1957, '58) and the 1000 km Nürburgring (1962). When asked about the key to winning as a race car driver, Gendebien responded: "It is a matter of taking the corners a little faster than one would want." In honour of Gendebien's three wins at the 12 Hours of Sebring, the turn onto the Ullman straight is named after him. He also won the Dolomites Cup, a one-lap sportscar race that took place on a 188-mile circuit in the Dolomite Mountains in Italy.

Major race victories
 Tour of Sicily : 1957
 Tour de France Automobile : 1957, 1958, 1959
 Reims 12 Hours : 1957, 1958
 Targa Florio : 1958, 1961, 1962
 12 Hours of Sebring : 1959, 1960, 1961
 24 hours of Le Mans : 1958, 1960, 1961, 1962
 1000km Nürburgring : 1962

Post race life
Married with three children, Gendebien's wife pressured him to get out of the dangerous sport of automobile racing where more than two dozen of his competitors had died at the wheel. At 38 years of age, in 1962 Olivier Gendebien retired following his fourth victory at Le Mans. Independently wealthy, and an avid skier, tennis player, and equestrian rider, he devoted the rest of his life to running a variety of businesses. In 1998 King Albert II awarded him the Belgian Order of the Crown.

Olivier Gendebien died in 1998 at his home in Les Baux-de-Provence in southern France.

Racing record

Complete Formula One World Championship results
(key)

Non-championship results
(key) (Races in bold indicate pole position)
(Races in italics indicate fastest lap)

Complete 24 Hours of Le Mans results

Complete 12 Hours of Sebring results

Complete 24 Hours of Daytona results

References

External links
Biographical article on The Speed Blog

1924 births
1998 deaths
Belgian racing drivers
Belgian Formula One drivers
Ecurie Nationale Belge Formula One drivers
Ferrari Formula One drivers
British Racing Partnership Formula One drivers
Reg Parnell Racing Formula One drivers
24 Hours of Le Mans drivers

24 Hours of Le Mans winning drivers
Recipients of the Order of the Crown (Belgium)
World Sportscar Championship drivers
Racing drivers from Brussels
24 Hours of Spa drivers
12 Hours of Sebring drivers
Belgian expatriates in the Democratic Republic of the Congo
12 Hours of Reims drivers